The 1957–58 season was Chelsea Football Club's forty-fourth competitive season. The season saw the debut of teenage prodigy Jimmy Greaves, who would go on to score 132 goals in 157 matches for Chelsea and become the youngest-ever player to score 100 goals in the English top-flight.

Table

Notes

References

External links
 1957–58 season at stamford-bridge.com

1957–58
English football clubs 1957–58 season